RRL may refer to:

 Regional Rail Link a new regional railway line in Victoria, Australia
 Regional Red List
 Rich Representation Language a computer language used for multi-agent animation
 Russian Rugby League Federation
 Regional Research Laborotaries, under the Council of Scientific and Industrial Research (CSIR), in India
 Road Research Laboratory, former name of the Transport Research Laboratory in the UK 
 Rocket Racing League
Radio relay link
 An acronym for Recommended Reading List